"Under the Influence of Love" is a song written by Paul Politi and Barry White. Felice Taylor had a minor hit with it in 1967.

Love Unlimited version
The song was covered by Love Unlimited on their 1973 album Under the Influence of... Love Unlimited. The single release in 1974 reached number 70 on the US Billboard R&B chart and number 76 on the Billboard Hot 100.

Other covers
The song was covered by Kylie Minogue on her 2000 album Light Years.

References

1973 songs
1974 singles
20th Century Fox Records singles
Songs written by Barry White
President Records singles